In phonetics, rhotic consonants,  or "R-like" sounds, are liquid consonants that are traditionally represented orthographically by symbols derived from the Greek letter rho, including ,  in the Latin script and ,  in the Cyrillic script.

This class of sounds is difficult to characterise phonetically; from a phonetic standpoint, there is no single articulatory correlate (manner or place) common to rhotic consonants. Rhotics have instead been found to carry out similar phonological functions or to have certain similar phonological features across different languages.

Being "R-like" is an elusive and ambiguous concept phonetically and the same sounds that function as rhotics in some systems may pattern with fricatives, semivowels or even stops in others. For example, the alveolar flap is a rhotic consonant in many languages, but in North American English, the alveolar tap is an allophone of the stop phoneme , as in water. It is likely that rhotics are not a phonetically-natural class but a phonological class.

Some languages have rhotic and non-rhotic varieties, which differ in the incidence of rhotic consonants. In non-rhotic accents of English, /ɹ/ is not pronounced unless it is followed directly by a vowel.

Types
The most typical rhotic sounds found in the world's languages are the following:

 Trill (popularly known as rolled r): The airstream is interrupted several times as one of the organs of speech (usually the tip of the tongue or the uvula) vibrates, closing and opening the air passage. Most non-alveolar trills, such as the bilabial one, however, are not considered rhotic.
Many languages, such as Bulgarian, Swedish, Norwegian, Frisian, Italian, Spanish, Russian, Polish, Ukrainian, Dutch and most Occitan variants, use trilled rhotics. In the English-speaking world, the stereotyped Scottish rolled  is well known.  The "stage pronunciation" of German specifies the alveolar trill for clarity. Rare kinds of trills include Czech   (fricative trill) and Welsh   (voiceless trill).
The uvular trill is another kind of rhotic trill; see below for more. 
Tap or flap (these terms describe very similar articulations): Similar to a trill, but involving just one brief interruption of airflow. In many languages flaps are used as reduced variants of trills, especially in fast speech. However, in Spanish, for example, flaps and trills contrast, as in pero  ("but") versus perro  ("dog"). Also flaps are used as basic rhotics in Japanese and Korean languages.
 Alveolar or retroflex approximant (as in most accents of English—with minute differences): The front part of the tongue approaches the upper gum, or the tongue-tip is curled back towards the roof of the mouth ("retroflexion"). No or little friction can be heard, and there is no momentary closure of the vocal tract. There is a distinction between an unrounded retroflex approximant and a rounded variety that probably could have been found in Anglo-Saxon and even to this day in some dialects of English, where the orthographic key is r for the unrounded version and usually wr for the rounded version (these dialects will make a differentiation between right and write). Also used as a rhotic in some dialects of Armenian, Dutch, German, Brazilian Portuguese (depending on phonotactics).
 Uvular (popularly called guttural r): The back of the tongue approaches the soft palate or the uvula. The standard Rs in European Portuguese, French, German, Danish, and Modern Hebrew are variants of this rhotic. If fricative, the sound is often impressionistically described as harsh or grating. This includes the voiced uvular fricative, voiceless uvular fricative, and uvular trill. In northern England, there were accents that once employed a uvular R, which was called a "burr".
In the syllable coda, it varies individually as a fricative, a flap or an approximant, though fricatives are ubiquitous in the Northern and Northeastern regions and all states of Southeastern Brazil but São Paulo and surrounding areas. Few dialects, such as sulista and fluminense, give preference to voiced allophones; elsewhere, they are common only as coda, before voiced consonants. Additionally, some other languages and variants, such as Haitian Creole and Timorese Portuguese, use velar and glottal fricatives instead of traditional rhotics, too.

It occurs only in the syllable coda.

Characteristics
In broad transcription rhotics are usually symbolised as  unless there are two or more types of rhotic in the same language; for example, most Australian Aboriginal languages, which contrast approximant  and trill , use the symbols r and rr respectively.  The IPA has a full set of different symbols which can be used whenever more phonetic precision is required: an r rotated 180°  for the alveolar approximant, a small capital R  for the uvular trill, and a flipped small capital R  for the voiced uvular fricative or approximant.

The fact that the sounds conventionally classified as "rhotics" vary greatly in both place and manner in terms of articulation, and also in their acoustic characteristics, has led several linguists to investigate what, if anything, they have in common that justifies grouping them together. One suggestion that has been made is that each member of the class of rhotics shares certain properties with other members of the class, but not necessarily the same properties with all; in this case, rhotics have a "family resemblance" with each other rather than a strict set of shared properties. Another suggestion is that rhotics are defined by their behaviour on the sonority hierarchy, namely, that a rhotic is any sound that patterns as being more sonorous than a lateral consonant but less sonorous than a vowel. The potential for variation within the class of rhotics makes them a popular area for research in sociolinguistics.

Variable rhoticity

English

English has rhotic and non-rhotic accents. Rhotic speakers pronounce a historical  in all instances, while non-rhotic speakers only pronounce  at the beginning of a syllable.

Dutch
Colloquial Northern Dutch speech of the Randstad region is variably rhotic.

After ,  may be dropped altogether, as in kilometer  'kilometer'. This is commonly heard in The Hague. It is not necessarily restricted to the word-final position, as it can also happen in word-final clusters in words such as honderd  'hundred'.

In citation forms,  in the syllable coda is pronounced as a pharyngealized pre-velar bunched approximant  (known in Dutch as the Gooise r) that is acoustically similar to :  etc. The pre-velar bunched approximant as well as the palatal approximant realization of  described above are virtually unknown in southern varieties of Dutch. In the varieties where they do occur, they are restricted to the syllable coda.

Other Germanic languages
The rhotic consonant is vocalized in the syllable coda in other Germanic languages, notably German, Danish, western Norwegian and southern Swedish. In English, non-rhoticity involves many phonemic mergers, such as the comma-letter merger or the caught-court merger.

Astur-Leonese
In Asturian, word-final  is always lost in infinitives before an enclitic pronoun, which is reflected in writing. For example, the infinitive form dar  plus the third-person plural dative pronoun "-yos" da-yos  ("give to them") or the accusative form "los" dalos  ("give them"). However, most speakers also drop rhotics in the infinitive before a lateral consonant of a different word, but that is not shown in writing: dar los dos  (give the two [things]). That does not occur in the middle of words: the name Carlos .

Catalan
In some Catalan dialects, word-final  is lost in coda position not only in suffixes of nouns and adjectives denoting the masculine singular and plural (written as -r, -rs) but also in the "-ar, -er and -ir" suffixes of infinitives: forner  "(male) baker", forners , fer  "to do", lluir  "to shine, to look good".

French
Final ⟨r⟩ is generally not pronounced in words ending in ⟨-er⟩. The R in parce que ("because") is not pronounced in informal speech.

Malay (including Indonesian)
The pronunciation of final  in Malay and Indonesian varies considerably. In Indonesian,  (lit. 'standard' in Malay) Malay, and Kedah Malay, the final  is pronounced, but in the Johor-Riau accent, the standard accent of Malay in Brunei and Malaysia, and several other dialects, it isn't.

The quality of the realization of the phoneme varies too. In the syllable onset, in Indonesian,  Malay, and standard Johor-Riau Malay, it varies between a trill , a flap , and sometimes, even an approximant . In many dialects of Malay, such as those of Kedah, Kelantan-Pattani and Terengganu, onset  is usually realized as a velar fricative . In Perak Malay, a uvular pronunciation,  is more common.

In Kedah Malay, final  is uniquely realized as a pharyngeal fricative .

Khmer
The historical final  has been lost from all Khmer dialects except Northern.

Portuguese
In some dialects of Brazilian Portuguese,  is unpronounced or aspirated. That occurs most frequently with verbs in the infinitive, which is always indicated by a word-final . In some states, however, it happens mostly with any  when preceding a consonant. The "Carioca" accent (from the city of Rio de Janeiro) is notable for this.

Spanish
Among the Spanish dialects, Andalusian Spanish, Caribbean Spanish (descended from and still very similar to Andalusian and Canarian Spanish), Castúo (the Spanish dialect of Extremadura), Northern Colombian Spanish (in cities like Cartagena, Montería, San Andrés and Santa Marta, but not Barranquilla, which is mostly rhotic) and the Argentine dialect spoken in the Tucumán province may have an unpronounced word-final , especially in infinitives, which mirrors the situation in some dialects of Brazilian Portuguese.

Thai
The native Thai rhotic is the alveolar trill. The English approximants /ɹ/ and /l/ are used interchangeably in Thai. That is, Thai-speakers generally replace an English-derived r (ร) with an l (ล), and when they hear an l (ล), they may write an  r (ร).

Turkish
In these cases, the preceding vowel is not lengthened.

In some parts of Turkey, like Kastamonu, the syllable-final  is almost never pronounced: gidiya instead of gidiyor ("she/he is going") and gide instead of gider ("she/he goes"). In gide, the preceding e is lengthened and pronounced somewhat between e and a.

Chinese
Northern Chinese accents, centered around Beijing, are well-known as having erhua which can be translated as "R-talk". This normally happens at ends of words, particularly ones that end in an -n/-ng sound. So a southern Chinese might say yī diǎn (一点) ("a little bit") but a Beijinger would say it more like [(j)i tʲɚ] which in Pinyin is sometimes rendered yī diǎnr to show if the word can be rhotacized. The final "R" sound is strongly pronounced, not unlike Irish or American accents.

Uyghur
Among the Turkic languages, Uyghur displays more or less the same feature, as syllable-final  is dropped, and the preceding vowel is lengthened: Uyghurlar  'Uyghurs'. The  may, however, sometimes be pronounced in unusually "careful" or "pedantic" speech; in such cases, it is often mistakenly inserted after long vowels even when there is no phonemic .

Yaqui
Similarly in Yaqui, an indigenous language of northern Mexico, intervocalic or syllable-final  is often dropped with lengthening of the previous vowel: pariseo becomes , sewaro becomes .

Lacid
Lacid, whose exonyms in various literature include Lashi, Lachik, Lechi, and Leqi, is a Tibeto-Burman language spoken by the Lacid people. There are various reports of their population from 30,000 to 60,000 people. Most are in Myanmar, but there are also small groups in China and Thailand. Noftz (2017) reports finding an example of a rhotic alveolar fricative in Lacid while he was doing phonological research at Payap University, in Thailand, in 2015. He was not able to continue his research and expressed the need for further examination of the segment to verify his results. It is postulated that the segment is a remnant of the rhotic fricative in Proto-Tibeto-Burman.

Kurdish
The Shekaki accent of the Kurmanji dialect of Kurdish is non-rhotic: the postvocalic flap "r" is not pronounced unlike the trill "R". When "r" is omitted, compensatory lengthening of the preceding vowel takes place:
 sar ("cold") is pronounced /saː/
 torr ("net") is pronounced /tor/ (with a trilled r)

Shekaki retains morphological syllables, instead of phonological syllables, in non-rhotic pronunciation.

Berber languages
However, a distinct phoneme  from earlier  exists and does not undergo the same development.

See also
 Rhotic and non-rhotic accents
 R-coloured vowel
 Guttural R

References

Further reading
 
 

Rhotic consonants